The University of North Texas Health Science Center (UNTHSC, UNT Health Science Center, or hsc) is a public academic health science center in Fort Worth, Texas. It is part of the University of North Texas System and was founded in 1966 as the Texas College of Osteopathic Medicine, with its first cohort admitted in 1970. UNT Health Science Center consists of five graduate schools with a total enrollment of 2,329 students (2020–21).

UNT Health Science Center serves as home to several NIH-funded research programs and currently leads all Texas medical and health science centers in research growth. The Health Science Center also houses laboratories for TECH Fort Worth, a non-profit biochemistry incubator, as well as the Atrium Gallery, a non-profit public art exhibition space which holds 8-10 arts shows each year.

History

UNT Health Science Center was initially founded in 1970 as the Texas College of Osteopathic Medicine (TCOM). TCOM was the first osteopathic medical school in Texas and remained the only one in the state until 2015, when the University of the Incarnate Word School of Osteopathic Medicine was established. The college opened as a private, non-profit school for osteopathic medicine and housed on the fifth floor of the Fort Worth Osteopathic Hospital. As enrollment increased, the school's need for additional space became evident. In 1971, TCOM students secured ownership of Taverner Bowling Alley, located next door to the osteopathic hospital, and made appropriate renovations, renaming the structure the "Basic Science Building." This building housed classrooms, basic science laboratories, and administrative offices for the medical school until demolition in 1975.

In 1975, the college became a part of North Texas State University, after the Texas Legislature overwhelmingly passed Senate Bill 216, making TCOM a state medical school. TCOM was the second public university-affiliated osteopathic medical school to be established. With university-appropriated funding, the school broke ground on several of the original buildings which now comprise the 33-acre campus.

In 1990, TCOM opened the DNA Identity Laboratory, with the responsibility of assisting the state of Texas in evaluating paternity cases. In 1993, the Graduate School of Biomedical Sciences opened, and TCOM was renamed the University of North Texas Health Science Center. In 1997, the UNT School of Health Professions opened a physician assistant program. In 1999, the School of Public Health opened. In 2008, UNTHSC opened the TECH Fort Worth Acceleration Lab. In 2009, the UNTHSC opened a Doctor of Physical Therapy (DPT) and PhD in Public Health Studies degree program's.

In 2011, the Texas Legislature authorized the establishment of a college of pharmacy at UNTHSC. As the first pharmacy school in North Texas, the college matriculated its inaugural class of Doctor of Pharmacy (PharmD) students in 2013. In 2013, UNTHSC began developing an inter-professional education (IPE) program, in participation with Texas Christian University (TCU). In 2014, Texas Woman's University joined the IPE partnership. In 2015, UNTHSC and TCU announced the creation of a joint MD school, which began matriculating students in 2018. TCU maintained accreditation as the degree-granting institution, with faculty and staff employed by the university, while under joint operation and governance with UNTHSC on the university's campus. On January 12, 2022, TCU and UNTHSC announced the end of their joint partnership of TCU and UNTHSC School of Medicine, with TCU solely responsible for the operation and governance of the renamed TCU School of Medicine.

In 2022, UNT Health Science Center's Physician Assistant, Health Care Management, Public Health, and Physical Therapy programs were ranked #33, #65, #90, and #97, respectively, by U.S. News & World Report. In its 2023 rankings, the publication also ranks Texas College of Osteopathic Medicine the top osteopathic medical school in the country for primary care.

Community and school outreach programs include Fort Worth's annual Hispanic Wellness Fair and the annual Cowtown Marathon. HSC launched Fort Worth's first Mobile Pediatric Clinic in 2013 to deliver health care to children living in underserved parts of the city. In 2020, HSC Fort Worth helped lead the response to the COVID-19 pandemic in North Texas, opening two drive-through testing centers, assisting in contact tracing, educating the public with fact-based health and safety information and working to protect underserved and at-risk communities.

Academics

UNT Health Science Center is governed by the University of North Texas Board of Regents. Through its five degree-granting schools, the health science center offers doctorate-, masters- and bachelors-level programs focusing on healthcare delivery and biomedical science. In order to promote and encourage inter-professional learning, the health science center uses an interprofessional education (IPE) model that brings together students from its various colleges and schools. Doctoral degrees offered include Doctor of Osteopathic Medicine (DO), Doctor of Philosophy (PhD), Doctor of Public Health (DrPH), Doctor of Physical Therapy (DPT), and Doctor of Pharmacy (PharmD).

Master's degrees include Master of Science, Master of Health Administration, and Master of Physician Assistant Studies. In 2021, SBS received preliminary accreditation from Southern Association of Colleges and Schools Commission on Colleges to offer an online bachelor's degree in biomedical sciences. The initial cohort started in fall 2022, and was the first undergraduate program at UNT Health Science Center.

Texas College of Osteopathic Medicine
Texas College of Osteopathic Medicine (TCOM), the first degree-granting graduate school at UNT Health Science Center, was founded in 1970. It is a public medical school and the first osteopathic medical school in Texas. As a primary care-oriented school, TCOM trains and graduates a large number of U.S. medical students entering general practice fields (e.g. family medicine, internal medicine, or pediatrics), and from 2018 to 2020, fifty-two percent of its graduates matriculated into these fields. At $13,079 for Texas residents, TCOM boasted the lowest annual tuition cost during the 2021–22 school year relative to tuition fees at all other osteopathic medical schools in the United States. Annual tuition was also the cheapest for in-state medical students in comparison to annual fees at the 15 other allopathic or osteopathic medical schools in Texas.

In September 2018, TCOM was granted a 10-year Accreditation with Exceptional Outcome, the highest level of accreditation given by the American Osteopathic Association's Commission on Osteopathic College Accreditation (COCA). Four other Colleges of Osteopathic Medicine have achieved the same accreditation level in the time since.

Medical curriculum
TCOM's medical curriculum consists of two years of pre-clinical studies and two years of clinical rotations. The first year consists of introductory basic science (e.g. anatomy, biochemistry, genetics, and immunology) integrated with physiologic processes structured by body system (cardiovascular, pulmonary, hematologic, musculoskeletal, renal, neurologic, and endocrine). During this time, students also learn physical examination, doctor-patient interactions, and the principles of osteopathic, palpatory diagnosis and manipulative therapy. After learning the physiologic foundations during the first year, the second-year curriculum shifts focus to disease processes and pathology, which are also organized by body system. TCOM's systems-based, two-pass preclinical curriculum, piloted by Bruce Dubin, DO, Associate Dean of Academic Affairs, has remained the same since conception in 2010 and is now widely replicated at sister osteopathic medical schools (e.g. RVUCOM, KCUMB-COM, etc.).

After the first two years, medical students are assigned a third year base site for third year clinical rotations in family medicine, internal medicine, obstetrics and gynecology, general surgery, psychiatry, and pediatrics. While most students elect to rotate through TCOM's primary teaching hospitals in the Dallas-Fort Worth metropolitan area, students may instead choose to relocate to Corpus Christi, Longview, Conroe, or Weatherford, where they spend the year clerking at satellite teaching sites.

COMLEX Board Scores
TCOM medical students achieved the highest exam score average, relative to students from all other U.S. osteopathic medical schools, on their COMLEX-USA ("Comprehensive Osteopathic Medical Licensing Examination of the United States") Level 1 Exam in 2019, 2020, and 2022. Level 1, the osteopathic counterpart to NBME's USMLE Step 1, is the first of three exams required for board certification of osteopathic physicians from U.S. medical schools granting the Doctor of Osteopathic Medicine degree. Annual tuition fees since 2020 have covered a 6-month subscription to USMLE World ("UWorld") and TrueLearn ("COMBANK") test bank questions.

Teaching hospitals

Primary teaching hospitals
 JPS Health Network in Fort Worth – The primary teaching institution of Texas College of Osteopathic Medicine (TCOM). Anchored by a 578-bed acute care hospital, the network includes more than 25 community-based clinics. John Peter Smith Hospital is home to Tarrant County's first and only Level I Trauma Center and its only psychiatric emergency services site, which is also the second-busiest psychiatric ER in the country.
 Cook Children's Medical Center in Fort Worth – The primary pediatric teaching institution for TCOM, this hospital is licensed for 430 beds and is one of the largest freestanding pediatric medical centers in the U.S. The hospital also has an ACS verified level II pediatric trauma center.
 Texas Health Resources (THR) Harris Methodist Hospital in Fort Worth – Awarded the highest advanced certification by The Joint Commission as a Comprehensive Stroke Center, the 726-bed hospital is also the first in the country to earn the prestigious designation as a Joint Commission Primary Heart Attack Center. Texas Health Resources is the largest faith-based, nonprofit health system in North Texas in terms of inpatients and outpatients served.
 Methodist Dallas Medical Center in Dallas – Home to one of Dallas County's 3 Level 1 Trauma Centers and to a Level III Neonatal Intensive Care Unit (NICU), Methodist Dallas is licensed for 556 beds. Awarded a Gold Seal of Approval from the Joint Commission, the hospital serves more than 175,000 patients per year.
 Driscoll Children's Hospital in Corpus Christi – Driscoll Children's Hospital is a 191-bed pediatric tertiary care center with more than 30 medical and surgical specialties offering care throughout South Texas, including Corpus Christi, the Rio Grande Valley, Victoria, and Laredo. The hospital remains the only free-standing children's hospital in South Texas. In 2020, Driscoll had almost 122,000 patient visits, including almost 28,000 patients seen at South Texas’ first emergency room created exclusively for children.
 Medical City Fort Worth and Medical City Dallas – Medical City Fort Worth and Medical City Dallas are 2 of 10 Medical City Healthcare Hospitals to be recognized with an "A" Leapfrog Hospital Safety Grade in 2021. The former is licensed for 348 beds; the latter, 668 beds. Part of the Texas Stroke Institute's Stroke Care Network, the hospitals are designated Comprehensive Stroke Centers and Joint Commission-certified chest pain centers.

Satellite campuses
 Medical City Weatherford (Weatherford, TX)
 CHRISTUS Spohn Hospital Corpus Christi - Shoreline and Corpus Christi Medical Center (Corpus Christi, TX)
 HCA Houston Healthcare Conroe (Conroe, TX)
 Christus Good Shepherd Medical Center - Longview (Longview, TX)

Affiliated foreign teaching hospitals
 Daeyang Luke Hospital, Malawi
 School of Medicine, Mae Fah Luang University, Thailand
 Institute of Medicine, Suranaree University of Technology, Thailand

Admissions
The admissions process is streamlined through Texas Medical & Dental Schools Application Service (TMDSAS), whereby applicants are ranked by schools at which they interview and then "matched" for final placement to a single Texas medical school of their highest preference. Thirteen other medical schools in Texas participate in TMDSAS, including UT Southwestern Medical School and Baylor College of Medicine.

ROME Rural Scholars Program

TCOM's Rural Osteopathic Medical Education ("ROME") Rural Scholars Program is an innovative educational program designed to prepare medical students for clinical practice in the rural, underserved setting. In addition to completing regular courses in preclinical medicine during their first two years of school, ROME Scholars have additional course requirements pertinent to their curricular focus in rural or international medicine. Core clinical rotations during third year are designed to provide focused training in the rural setting through assignments at designated rural-based training sites located throughout Texas or at affiliated hospitals in Malawi and Thailand.

Dual degree programs
TCOM also offers the following dual degree programs: B.A./D.O., D.O./M.P.H., D.O./M.S., and D.O./Ph.D.

Through the HSC Scholars in Cancer Research Program, DO/PhD students are able to pursue in-depth, mentored biomedical research training in oncological studies. Scholars enrolled in this program are supported with a stipend (up to $28,000 per year) and travel support (up to $1,000 per year) for up to 3 years. Tuition for medical school is fully covered as well.

Rankings
Texas College of Osteopathic Medicine was continuously ranked in the top 50 for primary care from 2002 through 2014. In its 2023 Rankings, U.S. News & World Report ranked the school #36 for primary care, which is the highest ranking for an osteopathic medical school in the category, and #95 for research. Additionally, TCOM was ranked #11 amongst 124 medical schools for producing the most graduates practicing in primary care fields.

In an annual report by George W. Bush Institute (2020), TCOM was ranked #1 amongst U.S. medical schools for innovation impact productivity, a measure of how well an institution converts research inputs (e.g. research spending) into patents, licenses, startups, widely cited papers, and graduates. The institute ranked UNTHSC-TCOM as the most productive U.S. medical school in impacting its local economy and society through innovation.

Graduate medical education
TCOM offers many residency training programs and fellowship training programs at affiliated training institutions, including John Peter Smith Hospital and Driscoll Children's Hospital. In partnership with UNTHSC Texas Center for Performing Arts Health, the medical school also offers the nation's first fellowship training program in Performing Arts Medicine.

School of Biomedical Sciences
The School of Biomedical Sciences, founded in 1993, offers Bachelor of Science, Master of Sciences, and Doctor of Philosophy degrees in several disciplines, such as: biochemistry and cancer biology; biotechnology; cell biology, immunology, and microbiology; clinical research management; forensic genetics; integrative physiology; medical science; genetics; pharmacology and neuroscience; pharmaceutical sciences and pharmacotherapy; structural anatomy and rehabilitation sciences; visual sciences. Academic departments include: Physiology & Anatomy; Microbiology, Immunology, & Genetics; and Pharmacy & Neuroscience.

Post-baccalaureate students may join the Medical Sciences ("Med Sci") Program to improve their credentials for admission to medical, veterinary, or dental school. Students in this 1-year program receive a Masters of Science in Medical Sciences.

TechFW Acceleration Lab
The TechFW Acceleration Lab opened in 2008 to provide laboratory space for TechFW clients needing wet labs in addition to their offices. The partnership between HSC and TechFW has granted clients of TechFW access to six wet labs and other resources at the university to leverage their development of new medical devices, novel discovery tools for health and pharmaceutical research, and other life science innovations.

School of Public Health
The School of Public Health, founded in 1999, confers a doctoral professional degree in Public Health Sciences and master's degrees in Public Health, Health Administration, and Public Health Sciences. The school also has graduate certification programs in Public Health and Healthcare Management.

School of Health Professions
The School of Health Professions, founded in 2004, confers a doctoral professional degree in Physical Therapy (DPT) and master's degrees in Physician Assistant Studies and Lifestyle Health Sciences & Coaching. The school also has a graduate certification program in Genetics and Genomics.

Techstars Physical Health Accelerator
In 2022, HSC received $4.8 million in funding from Tarrant County and City of Fort Worth to start a physical therapy-focused accelerator program with Techstars, a global investment business firm. Fort Worth and Tarrant County are both allocating $2.4 million for the project. Equity investments into the startup companies will be made by HSC and Goff Capital to total nearly $10 million for the project over three years.

Ten early startup companies focused on driving innovation in human movement are participating in the Accelerator's 3-month program. The companies are matched with mentors and undergo a rigorous program that prepare them for Demo Day, where startups present their newly curated pitches to venture capitalists, angel investors, foundations and family offices.

UNT System College of Pharmacy

Founded in 2011, UNT System College of Pharmacy (HSCCP) is a four-year program that leads to the degree of Doctor of Pharmacy (PharmD). Emphasis is placed upon training students to enter any area of pharmacy practice or pharmacy residency. During the first and second years of the curriculum, a heavy emphasis is placed on foundational courses in the biomedical and pharmaceutical sciences. During the second and third years, integrated pharmacotherapy is taught with an organ system approach.

In 2022, U.S. News & World Report ranked UNT System College of Pharmacy #90 amongst the 134 pharmacy schools participating in its annual rankings.

Pharmacy curriculum
Clinical case discussions in the first year focus on health promotion and communication skills, and in the second and third years, these discussions align with the pharmacotherapy blocks. Pharmacy Practice Skills Laboratories in Years 1 and 2 focus on medication preparation, patient interviewing and assessment, and professional communication skills. Students participate in Pharmacy Practice courses in Semesters 1 - 6, in which they study a broad range of areas, including biostatistics, health care delivery systems, pharmacoeconomics, law, ethics, history of pharmacy, communications, and more.

During Years 1 - 3, students engage in Introductory Pharmacy Practice Experiences (IPPE's) in which they work with pharmacists or fourth year pharmacy students in community and institutional pharmacies, participate in health promotion projects in the community, take Basic Life Support and Advanced Cardiac Life Support classes, and perform simulations on high fidelity manikins. IPPE's emphasize interprofessional collaboration with other health professions students at HSC. In the fourth year, students engage in Advanced Pharmacy Practice Experiences (APPE's), in which they provide patient assessment and care through medication management, provide drug information to patients, providers, and other health care professionals, engage in disease management and prevention, and engage in medication distribution through filling of prescriptions and medication orders, all under the direction of a licensed pharmacist preceptor.

Multidisciplinary programs
Dual degree programs offered include PharmD/MS, PharmD/PhD, and PharmD/MPH. Students are alternatively able to pursue special curricular emphases, such as Emphasis in Pharmacometrics or Emphasis in Pharmacy Compounding, and/or certifications in Applied Health Outcomes Research, Pharmacometrics, and Drug Discovery & Development.

HSC Health
HSC Health is a division of the university where faculty members provide health care services. HSC Health consists of 84 clinicians  practicing at 13 different, Dallas/Fort Worth-based clinics, including the HSC Health Pavilion, located on the medical school's main campus. Clinicians range from a variety of medical and surgical specialties and subspecialties, including audiology, allergy/immunology, family practice, cardiology, dermatology, gastroenterology, neurology, obstetrics & gynecology, optometry, osteopathic manipulative treatment, pediatrics, physiatry, psychiatry, speech language pathology, and sports medicine.

Texas Child MH Care Consortium
The Texas Child Mental Health Care Consortium (TCMHCC) was funded by the 86th State Legislature of Texas (2019) to expand access to care for children and adolescents in Texas. Mental health initiatives such as Child Psychiatry Access Network (CPAN), Texas Child Health Access Through Telemedicine (TCHATT), and Community Psychiatry Workforce Expansion (CPWE) are funded by the State of Texas through TCMHCC and offered through 13 health institutions, including UNT Health Science Center and JPS Health Network.

Through TCMHCC, HSC child psychiatrists provide assessment and behavioral telehealth visits to at-risk children and adolescents and telehealth-based consultation and training to pediatricians and primary care providers requiring clinical assistance to identify and treat mental health issues in their patients.

Campus

UNT Health Science Center's campus has grown from a few offices on the fifth floor of the Fort Worth Osteopathic Hospital into a 33.5-acre campus with 20 buildings and two parking garages. Supported by state funds and private donations, the institution purchased land east of the osteopathic hospital along Camp Bowie Boulevard to form a permanent campus in 1972. The first Campus Master Plan, crafted in 1972, created a vision for these sites, which included an academic building immediately east of the osteopathic hospital that was connected to a library, student union, and student housing. After the Health Pavilion (HP) opened in 1997, patient visits burgeoned in the academic health science center. Today, HSC is located on a 33.5-acre campus in the Cultural District of Fort Worth, TX. Within a three-mile radius from campus, there are four major hospitals concentrated into what is known as the Fort Worth Medical Center.

One of the most visible results of the subsequent Campus Master Plan, crafted in 2007, was the demolition of Fort Worth Osteopathic Hospital and its subsequent replacement with the Medical Education & Training Building (MET), the new academic center of campus. The 2007 plan also identified the construction site for the Interdisciplinary Research and Education Building (IREB), which opened in 2018. The 2018 Campus Master Plan, the most recent institutional roadmap, shows potential at full build-out for over 2.3 million gross square feet of space.

The Gibson D. Lewis Health Science Library's collections, which include more than 20,000 journal titles and 67,000 books, provide HSC students and faculty with access to the latest basic science and clinical research.

HSC Regional Simulation Center
In June 2022, HSC unveils its Immersive Regional Simulation Center, which will be located on the first floor of the Gibson D. Lewis Library. As a collaborative training hub for residency program trainees, clinical staff, emergency medical service providers, nursing home staffers, and HSC students, the $6.75 million facility will enable clinical programs within the region to incorporate virtual reality into their health care curriculum.

The HSC Regional Simulation Center will house 14 clinic exam rooms; a large, changeable procedural skills suite; an “activities of daily living” suite resembling the inside of a home; several multipurpose “teams” rooms; and several learning lounges, where students can study. Many of the rooms will be capable of being resized, remodeled, and adapted based on the needs of students and veteran health care workers.

Student life

A total of 2,329 students were in attendance at UNTHSC for the 2020–21 academic year. 62% of students were female; 38 percent were male. About 41% of students are White, 29% Asian, 15% Hispanic, and 8% Black. Because of state law regarding enrollment of Texas residents in public medical schools, each entering class is composed of at least 90% state residents. Before 2022, TCOM was the only Texas public medical school to grant admission to undocumented persons (Non-Resident Aliens), including Deferred Action for Childhood Arrivals ("DACA") recipients. As of Entry Year 2022, in accordance with state policy, only U.S. Citizens and U.S. Permanent Residents are considered for admission.

During 2021–22, UNTHSC has 157 registered student organizations (RSOs), the largest of which are Pediatrics Club, Emergency Medicine Interest Group, and American College of Osteopathic Family Physicians. Other popular or niche student groups include Christian Medical Association, American Society of Clinical Oncology (Oncology Student Interest Group), and Lesbian, Gay, Bisexual, Transgender Ally Alliance. In order to receive funding from student service fees, all student organizations are recognized as official organizations and are required to adopt a risk management policy (due to Texas House Bill 2639), which are reviewed and approved by the Office of Student Development.

Research

UNT Health Science Center has a total research expenditure of $79.1 million in fiscal year 2022, of which $53.1 million is federally sourced. Areas of research strength include population health, health disparities, ophthalmology, forensics, and healthy aging.

The Center for Human Identification's accredited forensic laboratory provides genetic and anthropological examinations for criminal casework and missing persons identification, local CODIS operations, and development. At North Texas Eye Research Institute (NTERI), which opened in 1992, scientists conduct investigate novel therapies for ophthalmologic disorders affecting patients in general as well as those from minority patient populations. At the Center for Health Disparities, scientists conduct prevention and outcomes research in areas such as Alzheimer's disease, diabetes, cardiovascular diseases, cancer, stroke, and HIV.

In 2018, HSC founded the Institute for Translational Research with the goal of translating basic science into treatments and new procedures for Alzheimer's and other diseases. The institute received a $45 million grant in 2020 from the National Institute on Aging (NIA), part of the National Institutes of Health (NIH), to examine the biological differences that cause Alzheimer's disease to disproportionately afflict Mexican Americans. The institute also received a $50 million award in 2020 from NIH to lead the coordinating center for the Artificial Intelligence/Machine Learning Consortium to Advance Health Equity and Researcher Diversity (AIM-AHEAD) program. The goal of AIM-AHEAD is building and advancing AI/ML approaches using EHR and other types of data (e.g., genomics, imaging, social determinants of health) to redress health disparities and advance health equity. Taken together, these are the largest research grants ever awarded in the same year to UNT Health Science Center.

Research Institutes
Research centers and institutes at UNTHSC include:

 Bone & Joint Research Center
 Cardiovascular Research Institute 
 Center for Commercialization of Fluorescence Technologies 
 Center for Community Health 
 Center for Human Identification
 Center for Health Policy
 Consortium on Alzheimer's Research and Education
 Focused on Resources for her Health Education and Research (FOR HER)
 Geriatric Education and Research Institute
 Institute for Aging and Alzheimer's Disease Research (IAADR)
 Institute of Applied Genetics 
 Institute for Cancer Research 
 Institute for Public Safety
 North Texas Eye Research Institute (NTERI)
 Osteopathic Research Center (ORC)
 Physical Medicine Institute
 Primary Care Research Center 
 TECH Fort Worth (Discovery Labs)
 Texas Center for Health Disparities
 Texas Center for Music and Medicine
 Texas Prevention Institute (TPI)
 UNT Center for Human Identification

Notable alumni, faculty and staff 
Ronald R. Blanck, former UNTHSC president; current chairman of the board of the Uniformed Services University of the Health Sciences
Michael Carletti, flight surgeon for the U.S. Air Force Air Demonstration Squadron ("Thunderbirds")
Rob Dickerman, DO/PhD-neurosurgeon
Scott Ransom, former UNTHSC president; current Partner in the Health & Life Sciences Advisory at Oliver Wyman
Paul S. Saenz, DO, team physician for the San Antonio Spurs.
J. D. Sheffield, physician in Gatesville, Texas and Republican member of the Texas House of Representatives from District 59 in Coryell County
David Siderovski, current Chair of UNTHSC Department of Pharmacology & Neuroscience.
Michael R. Williams, current UNTHSC president
Irvin Zeitler, past president of the Texas Medical Board
TeCora Ballom, DO MPH MSHI, United States Assistant Surgeon General, Rear Admiral, United States Public Health Service

References

Further reading 
Texas College of Osteopathic Medicine: The First Twenty Years, C. Ray Stokes (Editor), February 1991, paperback, University of North Texas Press,

External links
 Official website

 
North Texas Health Science Center, University of
Osteopathic medical schools in the United States
Universities and colleges in Fort Worth, Texas
University of North Texas System
Schools of public health in the United States
Educational institutions established in 1970